Midnight Lover is the second studio album of the Japanese jazz fusion group T-Square, who were then known as The Square. It was released on December 21, 1978.

Track listing 
Sources

Personnel 
Masahiro Andoh - guitar
Takeshi Itoh - alto saxophone
Junko Miyagi - Fender Rhodes Electric Piano, Korg MS-20 synthesizer, acoustic piano
Yuhji Nakamura - bass
Michael S. Kawai - drums, synthesizer drums
Kiyohiko Semba - percussion, synthesizer 
Shirō Sagisu - ARP String Ensemble
Yuhji Mikuriya - Additional guitars, acoustic guitar

References

1978 albums
T-Square (band) albums